During the 2018–19 season, Girona FC participated in La Liga and the Copa del Rey.

Players

Reserve team

Out on loan

Transfers

In

Out

Competitions

Overall

La Liga

League table

Results summary

Results by round

Matches

Copa del Rey

Round of 32

Round of 16

Quarter-finals

Statistics

Appearances and goals
Last updated on 18 May 2019

|-
! colspan=14 style=background:#dcdcdc; text-align:center|Goalkeepers

|-
! colspan=14 style=background:#dcdcdc; text-align:center|Defenders

|-
! colspan=14 style=background:#dcdcdc; text-align:center|Midfielders

|-
! colspan=14 style=background:#dcdcdc; text-align:center|Forwards

|}

Goalscorers

References

Girona FC seasons
Girona
2018–19 in Catalan football